Miani is a village and union council, an administrative subdivision, of Chakwal District in the Punjab Province of Pakistan, it is part of Kalar Kahar Tehsil.

References

Union councils of Chakwal District
Populated places in Chakwal District
Villages in Kallar Kahar Tehsil